John "Jack" Hardin Young is a trial lawyer who has a reputation for work in election law and electoral recounts.  He was on the team of lawyers for the Democratic National Committee during the 2000 Florida election recount and the Bush v. Gore case, and is portrayed in the HBO film "Recount".  He is widely known for being the first advocate for a statewide recount strategy that could have resulted in a win for Gore.

Young is currently senior counsel at Sandler, Reiff, Lamb, Rosenstein  & Birkenstock where he focuses on election law, including regulatory policy, corporate litigation, and dispute resolution.  Young served on the Board of Governors for the American Bar Association. He is the Chair of the 63,000 member Senior Lawyer Division of the ABA for the year 2017–2018.

Young is also an adjunct a professor  of international  and comparative election law at The College of William & Mary Law School and  has taught at the University of Pittsburgh School of Law and George Mason School of Law.

Education

Young earned a B.C.L from Oxford University (1976), a J.D. degree from the University of Virginia (1973), and an A.B. from Colgate University (1970).

Recounts 
Young is an expert on electoral recounts, domestic and international.  He is currently a Senior Global Election Dispute Resolution Advisor with the International Foundation for Electoral Systems and other non-governmental organizations (NGOs). He was part of the team of lawyers working with Al Gore during the Florida Recount in 2000.  He is portrayed by Steve DuMouchel in the HBO film Recount.  He urged the team to recount the ballots in every single precinct, not just the three counties that were initially selected.

His experience on the 2000 recount inspired him to create the now national Promote the Vote (PTV) program.  This program, launched by Young in the Virginia 2001 gubernatorial campaign, placed Democratic attorneys on-site at the polls statewide to help resolve voter registration and ballot concerns quickly and effectively.  The DNC adopted the PTV program for the 2004 presidential election, when thousands of attorneys volunteered across the country.  It remains in effect today, and is credited for helping secure Obama's victory.

He also worked on the recount that occurred in the 2005 Virginia Attorney General race between Bob McDonnell (R) and Democratic state senator Creigh Deeds (D). McDonnell won by 323 votes in an election in which 1.94 million votes were cast.  He was instrumental in the 2008 recount of the election between Tom Perriello and Virgil Goode in Virginia’s 5th Congressional District, and also worked on the recount for the 1989 election of Douglas Wilder, who became the first African American governor of Virginia.

Career 
Young was a partner for many years at Porter, Wright, Morris & Arthur, in Washington, D.C., where he was primarily responsible for commercial litigation and technology practice groups. In addition, he worked on technology company formation and capitalization, administrative law matters, business and tax litigation, and antitrust counseling.

In 2000, Young served as general counsel to the Office of Administration in the Executive Office of the President.  From 1985 until 1995, Young was a member of the U.S. Secretary of State’s Advisory Committee on Private International Law.  Prior to that, he provided trial counsel at the United States Department of Labor (1981–1982).  Young served as  Assistant Attorney General of Virginia  from 1976–1978.  During that time, Young also served as counsel to the Virginia State Board of Elections (1976–1978).

Additionally, he currently sits on the Advisory Committee of the Election Law Program at William & Mary Law School.

In August 2017, Delaware Governor John Carney  appointed Young to the Advisory Council on Services for Aging and Adults with Physical Disabilities for a term through 2020. 
Young  recently was awarded   by the Commandant of the U.S. Coast Guard with the Coast Guard Auxiliary Commendation Medal.

Books 
 International Election Principles: Democracy and the Rule of Law (editor and author, ABA 2009)
 Written and Electronic Discovery: Theory and Practice (with T. Zall & A. Blakley, Nat'l Inst. of Trial Advocacy 5th ed. 2009)
 Young’s Federal Rules of Evidence (West Pub. 6th ed. 2001)
 Mastering Written Discovery (with T. Zall, Lexis 3d ed. 2000)

Education 
Young received his Juris Doctor from the University of Virginia in 1973 and his B.C.L. from Exeter College at Oxford University in 1976.  He has a bachelor's degree from Colgate University.

References 

American legal scholars
College of William & Mary faculty
Living people
Year of birth missing (living people)
University of Virginia School of Law alumni
Alumni of the University of Oxford
Colgate University alumni